Irene María Montero Gil (born 13 February 1988), MP is a Spanish politician and psychologist, member of the Podemos party. She currently serves as the Minister of Equality of Spain since 13 January 2020. She is the partner of Pablo Iglesias, one of the founders and former leader of her party.

Since January 2016, Montero has also been an MP for Madrid in the Congress of Deputies, and from February 2017 to January 2020 she was the Spokesperson for the Parliamentary Group Unidos Podemos-En Comú Podem-Galicia en Común in Congress.

Early life and education 
Irene María Montero Gil was born in the Moratalaz neighborhood of Madrid. She joined the Communist Youth Union of Spain (UJCE) in 2004. She has a bachelor's degree in psychology from the Autonomous University of Madrid, and a master's degree in Educational Psychology. She received a scholarship for Harvard University, but chose to commit herself to politics instead of moving to the United States.

Political career

Early beginnings 
Montero joined Podemos after the elections to the European Parliament in 2014 together with Rafa Mayoral from the Platform of People Affected by Mortgages (PAH).

In November 2014, after being a candidate for the Citizen Council of Podemos, Montero was appointed head of Social Movements and began to lead the cabinet of the leader of Podemos, Pablo Iglesias, at which time she postponed her doctoral thesis project on new methods of educational inclusion to dedicate herself entirely to Podemos.

Member of Parliament, 2016–present 
Montero was a candidate for Madrid to the Congress of Deputies for Podemos in the elections of 20 December 2015, being elected deputy of the XI and the XII Legislature. Since 18 February 2017 she has held the position of Spokesperson of the United Confederal Group We Can-In Comú Podem-En Marea, being the youngest speaker of democracy.

During the election campaign of 20 December 2015 Iglesias announced that Montero would be the vice president and minister of the Presidency of a hypothetical government of Podemos.

In the elections of the Congress of Vistalegre II to the direction of Podemos was elected member of the State Citizen Council. She was the most voted woman, placing herself in fourth place, behind Pablo Iglesias, Pablo Echenique and Íñigo Errejón. She is currently a member of the Coordination Board of Podemos, secretary of Action in Congress.

As a deputy, in June 2017 Montero became the first woman in the history of Spain to intervene in parliament on a motion of no confidence.

In May 2018, Iglesias and Montero put their positions in Podemos up for a vote of no confidence, following backlash for purchasing a €615,000 country house in Galapagar. A total of 68.42% of party members voted to keep them in their roles.

Minister of Equality, 2020–present 
In January 2020, prime minister Pedro Sánchez appointed Montero as Minister of Equality. During her time in office, she oversaw the government's efforts on a bill to allow anyone over the age of 14 to change gender legally without a medical diagnosis or hormone therapy. She debated the ramifications of the bill with Deputy Prime Minister Carmen Calvo, who opposed it.

In August 2022, Spain passed legislation proposed by Montero since the La Manada rape case, in which consent for sexual intercourse had to be proven by affirmation. The change in the law allowed for convicted sex offenders to have their sentences reduced on appeal, a loophole which led to the right-wing opposition attacking Montero, who blamed the reductions on "machismo" of judges. By 1 December, 43 convicted sex offenders had their sentences reduced by up to seven years as a result of the new law. On 14 December, the Supreme Court of Spain upheld the reductions, as accused in Spain who are not at the end of the appeals process have the right to be re-sentenced under a later, more beneficial law.

Personal life
On 3 July 2018, Montero gave birth to twins, Leo and Manuel, in her relationship with Pablo Iglesias, the leader of her party. Due to their premature birth, the newborn children were kept in the intensive care at a public hospital of Madrid. On 4 August 2019, she gave birth to their third child, Aitana.

On 12 March 2020, it was reported that Montero had been infected by SARS-CoV-2, the virus that causes coronavirus disease 2019. She was reported to be in quarantine together with her domestic partner, Second Deputy Prime Minister of Spain Pablo Iglesias, while all members of the Spanish government were to be tested for the virus.

Controversy
According to the Official State Gazette (26 March 2021), Montero's net worth rose from  6,823 euros to 629,969 euros in the five years the start of her political career. Pablo Cambronero Piqueras, a member of the Congress of Deputies,
asked the government if it would investigate the possibility of corruption. However, there have been claims that the rise in Montero's net worth is a result of the estate of her late father.

References

External links 

1988 births
Autonomous University of Madrid alumni
Living people
Members of the 12th Congress of Deputies (Spain)
Members of the 11th Congress of Deputies (Spain)
Members of the 13th Congress of Deputies (Spain)
Women members of the Congress of Deputies (Spain)
Members of the 14th Congress of Deputies (Spain)
Transgender rights activists
Spanish LGBT rights activists
Spanish women activists